Aeneator benthicolus is a species of large sea snail, a whelk, a marine gastropod mollusc in the family Buccinidae, the true whelks.

References

 Powell A W B, New Zealand Mollusca, William Collins Publishers Ltd, Auckland, New Zealand 1979 
 Spencer H.G., Willan R.C., Marshall B.A. & Murray T.J. (2011) Checklist of the Recent Mollusca Recorded from the New Zealand Exclusive Economic Zone

Buccinidae
Gastropods of New Zealand
Gastropods described in 1963